Aria is a 1987 British anthology film produced by Don Boyd that consists of ten short films by ten different directors, each showing the director's choice of visual accompaniment to one or more operatic arias.  There is little or no dialogue from the actors, with most words coming from the libretto of the operas in Italian, French, or German.

The film was entered into the 1987 Cannes Film Festival.

Summary
The opening credits are set to the prelude to Giuseppe Verdi's La traviata.

Un ballo in maschera
A fictionalised account of the visit by King Zog I of Albania to Vienna in 1931, to see a lover, when opponents tried to assassinate him on the steps of the opera house (in fact after leaving a performance of Pagliacci) but by shooting back he survived.
 Music composed by Giuseppe Verdi
 Extracts: Prelude, "Re dell' abisso", "Di che fulgor che musiche", "La rivedra nell'estasi", "Ebben si t'amo", "Mezza notte", "O giustizia del fato"
 Sung by Leontyne Price, Carlo Bergonzi, Robert Merrill, Shirley Verrett, Reri Grist; conducted by Erich Leinsdorf
 Directed by Nicolas Roeg
 Starring Theresa Russell, Stephanie Lane
 Running time: 14 minutes

"" from La forza del destino
Three children in London, devoted to a statue of the Virgin Mary, steal and set fire to a luxury car, which they later watch on the TV news.
 Music composed by Giuseppe Verdi
 Sung by Leontyne Price; conducted by Thomas Schippers
 Directed by Charles Sturridge
 Starring Nicola Swain, Jackson Kyle, Marianne McLaughlin
 Running time: 5 minutes

Armide
In a gym, two young women working as cleaners are entranced by the muscles of the male bodybuilders, who maintain their concentration even when the women strip.
 Music composed by Jean-Baptiste Lully
 Extracts: "Ah! Si la liberté me doit être ravie", "Enfin, il est en ma puissance", "Venez,venez, Haine implacable"
 Libretto by Philippe Quinault
 Performed by Rachel Yakar, Danielle Borst; conducted by Philippe Herreweghe
 Directed by Jean-Luc Godard
 Starring Valérie Allain, Marion Peterson
 Running time: 11 minutes

Rigoletto
A bedroom farce set in the Madonna Inn at San Luis Obispo, in which a movie producer cheats on his wife with a pneumatic German starlet while unaware that his spouse is also there in the inn with a clandestine hunk of her own. The finale is a dance routine to La donna è mobile sung by an Elvis impersonator.
 Music by Giuseppe Verdi
 Extracts: "Questa o quella", "Gualtier Maldè... caro nome", "La donna è mobile", "Addio, addio"
 Sung by Robert Merrill, Anna Moffo, Alfredo Kraus; conducted by Georg Solti
 Directed by Julien Temple
 Written by Charlie Coffey
 Starring Buck Henry, Beverly D'Angelo, Garry Kasper, Anita Morris
 Running time: 14 minutes

"Glück, das mir verblieb" from Die tote Stadt
In the seemingly dead city of Bruges in winter, footage of empty buildings in deserted streets is intercut with a duet of two lovers in an ornate bed chamber.
 Music composed by Erich Wolfgang Korngold
 Sung by Carol Neblett and René Kollo; conducted by Erich Leinsdorf
 Directed by Bruce Beresford
 Starring Elizabeth Hurley, Peter Birch
 Running time: 5 minutes

Abaris ou les Boréades
In the Théâtre Le Ranelagh in Paris in 1734, a preview of the opera is given to an audience of inmates from a mental asylum.
 Music composed by Jean-Philippe Rameau
 Libretto by Louis de Cahusac
 Extracts:Entr'acte – "Suite des vents", "Nuit redoutable! ... Lieu désolé", "Jouissons, jouissons! Jouissons de nos beaux ans"
 Performed by Jean-Philippe Lafont, Philip Langridge, John Aler; conducted by John Eliot Gardiner
 Directed by Robert Altman
 Starring Julie Hagerty, Geneviève Page, Sandrine Dumas, Chris Campion
 Running time: 7 minutes

"Liebestod" from Tristan und Isolde
Two young lovers drive down Fremont Street in Las Vegas at night and in a cheap hotel, after making love, slash their wrists in the bath.
 Music composed by Richard Wagner
 Sung by Leontyne Price; conducted by Henry Lewis
 Directed by Franc Roddam
 Starring Bridget Fonda in her first credited film role; James Mathers as her lover.
 Running time: 7 minutes

"Nessun dorma" from Turandot
Unconscious after a car crash, a lovely young girl imagines her body is being adorned with diamonds and rubies in a tribal ritual, when in fact it is the preparations for surgery. After nearly dying on the operating table, she regains consciousness.
 Music composed by Giacomo Puccini
 Sung by Jussi Björling; conducted by Erich Leinsdorf
 Directed by Ken Russell
 Starring Linzi Drew
 Running time: 7 minutes

"" from Louise
A veteran opera singer gives her final performance, intercut by home movies of her on holiday when young and in love.
 Music composed by Gustave Charpentier
 Sung by Leontyne Price; conducted by Francesco Molinari-Pradelli
 Directed by Derek Jarman
 Starring Tilda Swinton, Amy Johnson, Spencer Leigh
 Running time: 6 minutes

"Vesti la giubba" from Pagliacci
In an ornate opera house, empty except for a possibly imaginary young woman, an aging virtuoso mimes his aria to an old cylinder recording and dies.
 Music composed by Ruggero Leoncavallo
 Sung by Enrico Caruso
 Directed by Bill Bryden
 Written by Bill Bryden and Don Boyd
 Starring John Hurt, Sophie Ward
 Running time: 4 minutes

The closing credits, after replaying a small excerpt of each of the ten operas, are again set to the overture to Giuseppe Verdi's La traviata, thus closing the cycle.

Reception
The film was nominated for the Palme d'Or at the Cannes Film Festival, won that year by Sous le soleil de Satan.

The American writer Leonard Maltin did not seem to appreciate the work: "Godawful collection of short films, each one supposedly inspired by an operatic aria. Precious few make sense, or even seem to match the music; some are downright embarrassing. Roddam's bittersweet Las Vegas fable (set to Tristan und Isolde), Beresford's sweet and simple rendering of Erich Wolfgang Korngold's Die tote Stadt are among the better segments—relatively speaking. A pitiful waste of talent."

Giving it three stars, Roger Ebert wrote: "I am not sure that any indispensable statement about opera has been made here, and purists will no doubt recoil at the irreverence of some of the images. But the film is fun almost as a satire of itself, as a project in which the tension between the directors and their material allows them to poke a little fun at their own styles and obsessions. You could almost call Aria the first MTV version of opera."

References

 Guerand, Jean-Philippe. In: Première (France). (MG), June 1987, p. 17
 Godard, Jean-Luc. "Jean-Luc Godard par Jean-Luc Godard", vol. 2, 1984–1998. Cahiers du cinéma, 1998, 2866421981

External links
 
 
 
 Aria (1987), British Film Institute
 Aria review at Digitally Obsessed

1987 films
1980s Italian-language films
1980s French-language films
1980s German-language films
British anthology films
1980s musical drama films
Films based on operas
Films directed by Robert Altman
Films directed by Bruce Beresford
Films directed by Bill Bryden
Films directed by Jean-Luc Godard
Films directed by Derek Jarman
Films directed by Franc Roddam
Films directed by Nicolas Roeg
Films directed by Ken Russell
Films directed by Charles Sturridge
Films directed by Julien Temple
Films shot in California
Films shot in Bruges
Films shot in Italy
Films shot in the Las Vegas Valley
Films shot in London
Films shot in Paris
Films shot in Scotland
1987 drama films
1980s British films